Zsuzsanna Szabó (born 3 April 1991) is a Hungarian football midfielder currently playing in the Hungarian First Division for MTK Hungária, with whom she has also played the Champions League.

References

1991 births
Living people
Hungarian women's footballers
Women's association football midfielders
MTK Hungária FC (women) players
Hungary women's international footballers